The 5th Golden Raspberry Awards were held on March 24, 1985, at Vine Street Elementary School in Hollywood, California, to recognize the worst the movie industry had to offer in 1984. Classic German silent film Metropolis was nominated for two Razzies, both for Giorgio Moroder's new score for the 1984 re-release.

Winners and nominees

Films with multiple nominations 
The following films received multiple nominations:

See also

1984 in film
57th Academy Awards
38th British Academy Film Awards
42nd Golden Globe Awards

External links
Official summary of awards
Nomination and award listing at the Internet Movie Database

Golden Raspberry Awards
Golden Raspberry Awards
05
1985 in Los Angeles
March 1985 events in the United States
Golden Raspberry